Zhanjiang, historically spelled Tsamkong, is a prefecture-level city at the southwestern end of Guangdong province, People's Republic of China, facing Haikou city to the south.

As of the 2020 census, its population was 6,981,236 (6,994,832 in 2010) whom 1,931,455 lived in the built-up (or metro) area consisting of four urban districts: Chikan, Xiashan, Potou and Mazhang. In 2007, the city was named China's top ten livable cities by Chinese Cities Brand Value Report, which was released at 2007 Beijing Summit of China Cities Forum.

History

Imperial China era
During the Qin Dynasty (221–206 BC), the area belonged to Xiang Shire. The imperial government of the Han Dynasty (206 BC−220 AD) set Xuwen County as the administrator of the whole Leizhou Peninsula. It was one of the earliest departure points on the Maritime Silk Road. It was a city port soon after.
Great numbers of Putian colonists settled in the Leizhou peninsula, establishing colonies during the Song empire. They soon formed the Leizhou peninsula's linguistic and ethnic majority, while others like the Baiyue, Cantonese, Tanka, foreigners lived on the coast of the peninsula.

French occupation

The region served as a small fishing port when it was occupied by the French in 1898. The next year, the French forced the Chinese to lease a small enclave of Zhanjiang to them for 99 years (until 1997), as the British Empire did in Hong Kong's New Territories and as the Germans did in the Kiautschou Bay Leased Territory, as the territory of Kouang-Tchéou-Wan. The local population fled before the arrival of the French, so upon French invitation, Cantonese peasants from north of Leizhou came to repopulate the empty French possession, thus the local language of communication was changed to Yue Chinese. The French wanted to develop the port, which they called Fort-Bayard, to serve southern China, in parts where France had exclusive rights to railway and mineral development. Their efforts, however, were hindered by the poverty of the surrounding land. The French controlled the small enclave until 1943, when the Japanese occupied the area during World War II. At the end of the war, the enclave was briefly ceded to the French before being formally returned to China in 1946 by General Charles de Gaulle, then the French head of state.

Return to China
Upon recovering the territory from the French, the Republic of China government decided to rename Kouang-Tchéou-Wan. The area was historically under the jurisdiction of Zhanchuan county, with a Zhanchuan customs post on the eastern island of the territory. As "Zhanjiang" was a historical variant of "Zhanchuan", it was decided to name the city "Zhanjiang".

Following the establishment of the People's Republic in 1949, Zhanjiang developed new importance. From 1957, Zhanjiang has developed into a major modern port serving southern China, usable by ships of up to 50,000 tons. In 1984 Zhanjiang was designated one of the "open" cities of China, where the central government invited foreign investment; this spurred the city's further industrial development. It has shipyards and engineering works; automobile, electrical-appliance, and textile plants; and sugar refineries, flour and rice mills, and chemical works.

In the early 1990s a new rail line was completed, linking Zhanjiang with Guangzhou, the provincial capital. The line was later extended to Hai'an, at the southernmost tip of Leizhou Peninsula, where trains could be transported by Guangdong–Hainan Ferry (part of the Guangdong–Hainan Railway) across the Hainan Strait to Haikou city.

Geography

Zhanjiang is to the southwest of the city of Guangzhou on an inlet of the South China Sea. It is on the eastern coast of the Leizhou Peninsula.

The spoken language in Potou District and other districts is Yue Chinese brought by Cantonese peasants that trace their ancestry to rural Guangdong during the French occupation of downtown while the Min speaking majority fled before the French arrived. Leizhou Min is the prestige language spoken in Xiashan District, Mazhang District, Xuwen County, Leizhou City, etc. The dialect in Lianjiang County is Hakka Chinese.

Climate 
Zhanjiang has a humid subtropical climate (Köppen  Cwa), with short, mild, overcast winters and long, very hot, humid summers. The monthly daily average temperature in January is 16.2 °C (60.6 °F), and in July is 29.1 °C (84.2 °F). From April to September, rainfall is the heaviest and most frequent. The summer and winter temperatures are moderated due to the influence of the nearby ocean.

Administration
Zhanjiang has direct jurisdiction over nine county-level divisions:

Military
Zhanjiang serves as headquarters of the South Sea Fleet of the People's Liberation Army Navy. It is also home base to two marine brigades.

Economy
Zhanjiang is a port city and trade center with a diversified industrial base, including a shipyard, textile plants, sugar refineries. plants producing automobiles, chemicals and electrical appliances as well as rice mills. From 2012 to 2014, economy of Zhanijang grew to a new level. In 2013, with 92 different key projects, the total investment reaches 306.9 million. In 2014, the GDP of Zhanjiang was 225.87 billion yuan. The growth of GDP was 10 percent. Industrial enterprises above designated size added value of 73.49 billion yuan. Fixed Investment was 102 billion yuan and the growth was about 30 percent. Also, the total retail sales of consumer goods was 116 million dollars with growth of 13.e percent. The government believes that the GDP of Zhanjiang will be double on 2017 to achieve 400 billion and the speed of GDP growth will stay nearly 12 percent. With the opening up of the Wushi oil field in the South China sea, off the coast of Zhanjiang in 2016, the city has assumed further importance in the oil and gas exploration activities in the South China Sea.

Port of Zhanjiang
The Port of Zhanjiang is one of the finest deep water ports in China. Its historical name was Guangzhouwan. It is the southernmost port on the coast of mainland China and serves as a shipping outlet for much of Southwest China. The port of Zhanjiang, built in 1956, was the first modern port designed and developed after the founding of the People's Republic of China and serves as the headquarters for the People's Liberation Army Navy's South Sea Fleet. The Zhanjiang Port is one of the eight major ports in China, with an annual throughput of more than 2,600 million tons. The port allows easy access to the ocean from provinces in South and West China, and also allows Zhanjiang to be open to navigation with more than 100 countries. It is important to the development of steel industry in Zhanjiang. The port also services off shore support vessels plying to oil rigs and craft in the Wushi oil field.

Agriculture
Sugarcane production was Zhanjiang's most prominent agricultural product in 2007: in 2006 it was 9,135,500 tons and it was 10,000,000 tons in 2007. Akoya cultured pearls, pineapples, bananas, papayas, seafood, farm-raised prawns and fish are other products that play a prominent role in the agricultural economy of Zhanjiang.

In 2014, the modern agriculture of Zhanjiang keeps increasing. There were 14 new leading enterprises of agriculture in the city. And the high-standard basic farmland increased 730 thousands mu of land.

With the effect of Guangdong and Taiwan Agricultural Cooperation Project, Zhanjiang and Taiwan keeps increasing the depth of cooperation. The aspects of cooperation includes tropical products, fishery industry, animal husbandry and ecological agriculture. The government is trying to improve the platform of cooperation and construct more test sites for cooperative agricultural experiments.

Industry
Industrial economy to make a breakthrough, a marked increase in the number of units. Zhanjiang in 2007 of all industrial output value of 112.134 billion yuan, up 17.1 percent, a growth rate of nearly four-year high of 15.3 billion net increase over the previous year. In 2007 the city's industrial enterprises above designated size reached 714, 71 more than the year before, industrial output value of over 100 million of the 132 enterprises.

Zhanjiang Economic and Technological Development Zone was founded in 1984. The zone has a very good location for transportation. It is very convenient to get to the airport, the national highway G325 as well as the port. The major industries in the zone including automobile assembly, biotechnology and computer software.

The steel industry is developing during 2010 to 2013. The large-scale project of iron, steel and petrochemical began to construct in 2013. This project is aimed at promoting the local economy by producing 15 million metric tons of crude oil and 1 million tons of ethylene annually when the operation of the steel industry activate in 2017. The expected output of the project is near 300 billion yuan which will stimulate the development of economy of Zhanjiang notably. The main market of the steel industry will focus South China and Southeast Asia. But the protect of environment also becomes an important issue during the growth of industry. 8% of 50 billion yuan total investment in this project will be used to environmental protection and energy saving.

BASF announced the start of a US$10 billion investment project in November 2019. A ″Verbund″ site for the production of engineering plastics and thermoplastic polyurethane is expected to be operational by 2022. The site would be the third-largest BASF site worldwide, following Ludwigshafen, Germany, and Antwerp, Belgium.

Business
In 2007, the total value of retail sales of consumer goods in Zhanjiang totaled 38.216 billion yuan, an increase of 19.5% over the previous 12 years.

In 2014, Zhanjiang constructed a French-style street with the theme of travel and leisure. The project not only tried to protect and renew old French-style buildings, but also would lead the development of the city's fashion business. The whole street was separated into five areas. They are respectively shopping area, food area, culture are, special commerce area and show of art area. According to statistics, the visitor reached  people during Christmas 2014. Those visitors directly brought 300 million yuan combustion to the street.

Transport

Air 
The city is served by the Zhanjiang Wuchuan Airport .

Rail 
There are five railways passing through Zhanjiang, namely the China Railway Corporation Lizhan Railway, the China Railway Corporation Shenzhan Railway, the China Railway Corporation Luozhan Railway, and the China Railway Corporation Yuehai Railway. There are two railway stations in Zhanjiang, namely Zhanjiang railway station and Zhanjiang West railway station: Zhanjiang Railway Station belongs to Lizhan Railway, Luozhan Railway and Hezhan Railway; Zhanjiang West Railway Station belongs to Yuehai Railway and Shenzhan High-speed Railway.

Highway 
There are 207 National Highway, 228 National Highway and 325 National Highway in the Zhanjiang. The expressway has G15 Shenhai Expressway Maozhan section, G75 Yuzhan Expressway and G75 Zhanxu Expressway.

Tourism
The well-known tourist attractions, the "Zhanjiang Eight", are as follows:
East Island
Huguangyan National Geopark: This scenic area is a national geological park famous for its natural volcano relic. It has the most typical and largest maar (volcanic) lake in the world.
View of the sea promenade
Park Jin-inch
Lighthouse
South Asia Subtropical Botanical Garden
South Isles
Zhanjiang Port: in the southeast part of the city proper, it once had passenger transport station operating liner to reach Haikou. However, there are no longer passenger liners directly from the city proper to Haikou. Visitors should go to the Hai'an Dock in Xuwen County for this connection.
Donghai Island: It ranks as the fifth largest island in China. A popular holiday resort has been built on the east side. In addition to the forest and beautiful sea, it has a 28-kilometer-long beach.
Naozhou Island: It has favorable weather in every season. The Naozhou Lighthouse with over a hundred years' history is the highlight of the island.

Major theme attractions
South Park
North Park
Hoi Tin Park
Southern tropical garden
Sino-Australian Friendship Garden
Jin Sha Wan Park
Golden Bay promenade Guanhai
Zhanjiang Waterfront Park
Park fishing port
Xia Lake Park
Green River Wetland Park
Cunjin Bridge Park

French architectural monuments
 French minister to the Department of the Guangzhou Bay
 France, the Police Department, Guangzhou Bay
 St. Victor Roman Catholic Church
 Calyon site
 Guangzhou Bay Chamber of Commerce Center

Sports

Football is the most popular sport in the city. The Zhanjiang Olympic Main Stadium, which has a capacity of 40,000 and opened in 2015, is the largest sports venue by capacity in Zhanjiang.

Quan hong chan (全紅蟬) won the gold medal in women’s diving in Tokyo Olympic game 2021.

See also
List of twin towns and sister cities in China

References

External links 

 Official website of Zhanjiang Government

 
Prefecture-level divisions of Guangdong